Crystal Shinelle Cox (born March 28, 1979, in Norfolk, Virginia) is an American track and field athlete who was on the national team at the 2004 Athens Summer Olympics and appeared as a contestant on the seventeenth season of the reality series Survivor.

Career
Cox won a gold medal in the women's 4x400 m relay at the 2004 Athens Summer Olympics. She was later stripped of the gold in 2012 after she admitted to doping. In Athens she ran in the preliminary round but not in the final. DeeDee Trotter, Monique Henderson, Sanya Richards and Monique Hennagan ran in the final. In 2004, she was the American indoor 200 m champion.

On January 29, 2010, the Associated Press and ESPN.com reported that Cox admitted to using anabolic steroids from 2001 to 2004. As a result, she forfeited all of her results from that time period, and agreed to a four-year suspension that ended in January 2014. The IAAF has recommended that the whole U.S. women's 2004 Olympic 4x400 metres relay team be stripped of their medals. In 2013, both the IAAF and the IOC announced that the American squad (except Cox) would be allowed to retain their gold medals.

Survivor
Cox was one of the contestants in Survivor: Gabon, which premiered in Fall 2008. Despite her Olympic training, Cox lost 11 of the 13 tribal challenges, though she made it to the final six. Her main alliance consisted of Kenny Hoang, Jessica "Sugar" Kiper, Susie Smith, and Matty Whitmore. On the December 11, 2008, episode, Cox was voted out and became the fifth member of the jury.

References

External links
 
 Crystal Cox  at Trackandfield.com
 Crystal Cox biography for Survivor: Gabon at CBS.com
 American sprinter Crystal Cox stripped of 2004 Olympic Gold Medal in 4X400 relay'' at nj.com

1979 births
Living people
Athletes (track and field) at the 2003 Pan American Games
Athletes (track and field) at the 2004 Summer Olympics
American female sprinters
Sportspeople from Norfolk, Virginia
Track and field athletes from Virginia
Olympic track and field athletes of the United States
Doping cases in athletics
Survivor (American TV series) contestants
African-American female track and field athletes
Competitors stripped of Summer Olympics medals
Pan American Games track and field athletes for the United States
Olympic female sprinters
21st-century African-American sportspeople
21st-century African-American women
20th-century African-American sportspeople
20th-century African-American women
20th-century African-American people